Talon is an inverted roller coaster located at Dorney Park & Wildwater Kingdom in Allentown, Pennsylvania. Manufactured by Bolliger & Mabillard and designed by Werner Stengel at a cost of $13 million, Talon opened to the public in 2001 and was marketed as the tallest and longest inverted coaster in the Northeast.

History
On April 28, 2000, Dorney Park announced that a  four inversion inverted roller coaster would be built for the 2001 season. No further details were given until August 30, 2000 when Dorney Park announced the full details of the new $13 million roller coaster and its name, Talon. The ride would be the Northeast's longest inverted roller coaster and would be built on a portion of land set aside for a major attraction by Cedar Fair when they purchased the park in 1992. Construction began on September 5, 2000 and continued through the winter. The first parts of Talon to be put into place were the brake run and transfer track in October 2000. The roller coaster was topped off (the highest piece of the lift hill) on November 21, 2000 and the track was completed in early 2001. After testing was complete, Talon opened on May 5, 2001.

Experience

Having dispatched from the station, the train immediately begins to climb the  lift hill. Once at the top, the train goes through a pre-drop before making a sharp  downward right turn. After exiting the loop, the train goes through a zero-gravity roll before dropping back to the ground and entering an Immelmann loop. The train then makes a full 360-degree upward right turn followed by a left turn leading into another drop. After the drop, the train makes a highly banked right turn into a flat spin. Next, the train makes a left turn (extremely close to the ground) before heading to a moment of airtime, and back up which leads into the brake run. After exiting the brake run, the train makes a right turn into a second, shorter, set of brakes before entering the station.

One cycle of the ride lasts about 2 minutes.

Characteristics

Trains
Talon operates with two steel and fiberglass trains. Each train has eight cars that can seat four riders in a single row for a total of 32 riders per train. The train structure is coloured blue and turquoise, the seats are black, and the over-the-shoulder restraints are yellow.

Track
It was manufactured by Clermont Steel Fabricators located in Batavia, Ohio. Unlike other B&M coasters, the track is filled with sand to reduce the noise produced by the trains. The tracks are painted orange and yellow while the supports are blue.

Slogan & theme
The entrance sign has a mini-slogan as "The Grip Of Fear. The word "Talon" is named after a claw, which is specifically found on birds of prey and mythical creatures. The ride is themed as a bird of prey.

Awards

References

External links

Official page

Roller coasters introduced in 2001
Roller coasters operated by Cedar Fair
Roller coasters in Pennsylvania
Inverted roller coasters manufactured by Bolliger & Mabillard